Frank Paparelli (* December 25, 1917 in Providence, Rhode Island; † May 24, 1973 in Los Angeles, California) was an American Jazz pianist, Composer and Author. He was a pianist in Dizzy Gillespie's band during the mid-1940s, and is notable as the co-writer (with Gillespie) of the bebop standard "A Night in Tunisia" and "Blue 'n' Boogie".

Publications
The Blues and how to Play 'em. Piano method book. New York, Leeds Music 1942
Don Raye/Frank Paparelli: Piano Music – (That Place) Down the Road a Piece. D. Davis & Co. 1943.
Nat 'King' Cole – Piano Capers, Transcribed and Edited by Frank Paparelli. New York: Leeds Music Ltd. 1946
2 to the Bar - Dixieland Piano Method. New York City, Leeds Music Corporation 1946
Thelonious Monk, Dizzy Gillespie – 52nd Street Theme - Be-Bop (New Jazz), arranged by Frank Paparelli. London, Bosworth & Co 1948
Dizzy Gillespie, Gil Fuller, Jay Roberts – Oop Bop SH-Bam - Be-Bop (New Jazz), arranged by Frank Paparelli. London, Bosworth & Co 1948
Boogie Woogie for Beginners. Hal Leonard Publishing Corporation 1985

External links 
 Website
Frank Paparelli at Discogs
German Wikipedia

1917 births
1973 deaths
20th-century American writers
American jazz pianists